"Speed Rail" is an instrumental composition by Dutch disc jockey and producer Tiësto. It was released on 10 September 2010 in the Netherlands as a promotional single.

Background and release 
"Speed Rail" was produced by Tiësto to be included in the video game DJ Hero 2. The composition was released on Juno Download for free.

Music video 
The music video premiered on Tiësto's official YouTube channel on October 26, 2010. The music video features animated footages taken from DJ Hero 2 showing Tiësto mixing.

Track listing 
Digital Download (MFPROMO 001)
 "Speed Rail" - 4:24

Charts

In popular culture 
The composition appears in DJ Hero 2, mixed together with "I Will Be Here".

References 

2010 songs
2010 singles
Tiësto songs
Songs written by Tiësto